"Muss i denn" (German for "must I, then") is a German folk-style song in the Swabian German dialect that has passed into tradition. The present form dates back to 1827, when it was written and made public by Friedrich Silcher.

The melody and some verses of this song became widely known through Elvis Presley's adaptation "Wooden Heart" in 1960, as well as Joe Dowell's version in 1961, becoming one of the most widely known German songs ever.

History
"Muss i denn" is about a man – originally a journeyman embarking to his traditional "Wanderjahr" journey – who has to leave the woman he loves and vows to remain faithful until he is back to marry her. It first appeared on page sixteen of Friedrich Silcher's collection of popular songs, Volkslieder, gesammelt und für vier Männerstimmen gesetzt, Opus 8, Nr. 12 (folk songs, collected and set for four male voices). The origin of the song, however, is obscure and the original text was not recorded. Silcher mentioned to Ludwig Uhland that the melody was "an old melody from Württemberg".
 
The song became famous beginning in the mid-19th century. It soon was especially well-liked among the German military as well as among excursion groups and thus was early on considered a patriotic song. It also became popular among German merchant seamen as a capstan shanty, and has been played as a naval quick march since the days of the Imperial German Navy. An early English translation titled "Must I, then? Must I, then? From the town must I, then?" was made by Henry William Dulcken in 1856.

Some "Muss i denn" versions were widely popularized in the 20th century; those interpreted by German-American actress Marlene Dietrich and by French singer Mireille Mathieu and Greek singer Nana Mouskouri deserve mention. The latter also sings English words (though not a translation) to the tune, under the title "There's a Time".

Lyrics

Melody 
The melody as given in Silcher's publication is as follows:

Bibliography
Tobias Widmaier: "Von Silcher zu Elvis. Metamorphosen eines schwäbischen 'Volksliedes'". In: Vom Minnesang zur Popakademie. Musikkultur in Baden-Württemberg. Katalog zur Großen Landesaustellung Baden-Württemberg 2010, edited by the Badischen Landesmuseum Karlsruhe. Karlsruhe 2010, pp. 347–50.
August Holder: "'Muss i denn, muss i denn zum Städtele naus'. Ein schwäbischer Beitrag zur Naturgeschichte der Volksliederdichtung". In: Alemannia 19 (1892), pp. 144–148.

References

External links
"Muss i denn", ingeb.org

Volkslied
German patriotic songs
Swabia
1827 songs
Songs about parting